Nu Draconis (also known as ν Dra, ν Draconis, or traditionally as Kuma ) is a double star in the constellation Draco. The respective components are designated ν1 Draconis and ν2 Draconis. The second component is a spectroscopic binary star system.

This star, along with β Dra (Rastaban), γ Dra (Eltanin), μ Dra (Alrakis) and ξ Dra (Grumium) were Al ʽAwāïd, "the Mother Camels", which was later known as the Quinque Dromedarii.

The two stars of the visual binary are considered to be a common proper motion pair on the basis of their very similar parallaxes, radial velocities, and proper motions, although no orbital motion can be observed.

ν1 Draconis is an Am star, a slowly-rotating chemically peculiar star with abnormally strong metallic absorption lines in its spectrum.  Its spectral type of kA3hF0mF0 means that it would have a spectral class of A3 if determined solely from its calcium K lines, F0 if determined from its hydrogen lines, and F0 if determined from other metallic spectral lines.

ν2 Draconis is a spectroscopic binary with a period of 38 days.  The two stars are separated by 0.267 au on average, and they have an almost circular orbit with an eccentricity of 0.03.  The primary is also an Am star, while the secondary has a low mass and luminosity and is only inferred from the orbital movement of the more massive star.

References

External links
 Kaler, James. Kuma

Triple star systems
Draco (constellation)
Draconis, Nu
Draconis, 24 5
A-type main-sequence stars
085819 29
159541 60
Durchmusterung objects
6554 5
Am stars
A-type subgiants